Free from Sin is a 1979 reggae album by Prince Far I. It was produced by Prince Far I and engineered by Sylvan Morris & Errol Brown.

Track listing
"Free from Sin"
"When Jah Ready You Got to Move"
"Call On I in Trouble"
"Don't Deal with Folly"
"Light of Fire"
"Reggae Music"
"Go Home on the Morning Train"
"Siren"
"I and I Are the Chosen One"

Personnel
Prince Far I - vocals
Lincoln "Style" Scott - drums
Flabba Holt - bass guitar
Noel "Sowell" Bailey - lead guitar, strings
Chinna - lead guitar
Bingy Bunny - rhythm guitar
Bobby Kalphat - keyboards
Easy Snappin' - keyboards
Bobby Ellis - horns
"Deadly" Headley Bennett - horns
Bongo Herman - bongos, percussion
Ras Menilik Dacosta - bongos, percussion

References

External links
Free From Sin at Roots Archives

Prince Far I albums
1979 albums
Trojan Records albums